Dollar Bay is a census-designated place (CDP) in Houghton County, Michigan, United States. The population was 1,082 at the 2010 census.

Geography

Dollar Bay is located in the southwest corner of Osceola Township. The CDP extends west into Franklin Township as far as Goat Hill Road and south into Torch Lake Township. The community takes its name from Dollar Bay, a small inlet of Portage Lake, the water body that separates the Keweenaw Peninsula from the rest of the Upper Peninsula of Michigan.

M-26 is the main highway through Dollar Bay, leading west  to Hancock and northeast  to Hubbell.

Demographics

References

External links

Census-designated places in Houghton County, Michigan
Census-designated places in Michigan